Scott E. Green (June 3, 1951 - September 27, 2016) was an American politician, poet, and non-fiction writer. He a four-term member of the New Hampshire House of Representatives for Manchester.

He was a Vice-President of the National Writers Union and a trustee for its At-Large chapter; and president of the Science Fiction Poetry Association.

Life
He was a graduate of Bates College (B.A. Asian History) and Rhode Island College (M.A., American History).

Works
Non-fiction
 Contemporary Science Fiction, Fantasy and Horror Poetry: A Resource Guide and Biographical Directory (Greenwood Press, 1989)  ; 
 Directory of Repositories of Family History in New Hampshire (Clearfield Co., 1993) OCLC 29535603; 
 Isaac Asimov: An Annotated Bibliography of the Asimov Collection at Boston University (Greenwood, 1995)  ; 
Poetry
 Private Worlds (1985);
 ; Speaking Volumes, 2011,  
 Baby Sale at the 7-Eleven, Bloom Books, 1984,  
 Pulp: Poems in the Pulp Tradition, W.P. Ganley, Publisher, 2004,

References

External links
Green's home page
Green Genre Poetry blog, on which he reports about defunct poetry publishers.

Living people
American male poets
Members of the New Hampshire House of Representatives
Novelists from New Hampshire
1951 births
American male novelists
American science fiction writers